Barren River Lake State Resort Park is a  park located in Barren County, Kentucky and extending into parts of Allen County and Monroe County. Barren River Lake, its major feature, is an artificial lake created with the building of a  dam by the U.S. Army Corps of Engineers begun in 1960. The park was dedicated in 1965.

Attractions
Fishing is a major attraction at this park. The largest hybrid striped bass ever taken in Kentucky (20 lb., 8 oz.) was caught in Barren River Lake in 1991. The lake contains several other species of fish, including crappie, smallmouth bass, white bass, and big channel catfish.

The lake also includes 4 marinas to support boating and water skiing. Numerous trails provide hiking and biking opportunities. The most popular hiking trail is the  Lewis Hill Trail which is also known as the Connell Nature Trail. Guided horseback rides are available seasonally. The park also features an eighteen-hole golf course.

Events
The Trashmasters cleanup day is a popular volunteer event that helps keep the park clean. Also, each June, the park plays host to Glasgow's Highland Games, a miniature version of the Glasgow, Scotland tradition.

References

External links
Barren River Lake State Resort Park  Kentucky Department of Parks
Glasgow (Kentucky) Highland Games

Protected areas of Allen County, Kentucky
Protected areas of Barren County, Kentucky
State parks of Kentucky
Protected areas of Monroe County, Kentucky
Protected areas established in 1965
1965 establishments in Kentucky
Lake State Resort Park